The 2021–22 Southern Illinois Salukis men's basketball team represented Southern Illinois University Carbondale during the 2021–22 NCAA Division I men's basketball season. The Salukis were led by third-year head coach Bryan Mullins and played their home games at the Banterra Center in Carbondale, Illinois as members of the Missouri Valley Conference. They finished the season 16–15, 9–9 in MVC play to finish in sixth place. They lost in the quarterfinals of the MVC tournament to Drake.

Previous season
In a season limited due to the ongoing COVID-19 pandemic, the Salukis finished the 2020–21 season 12–14, 5–13 in MVC play to finish in ninth place. In the MVC tournament, the Salukis defeated Bradley in the first round before losing to the Loyola in the quarterfinals.

Roster

Schedule and results

|-
!colspan=12 style=| Exhibition

|-
!colspan=12 style=| Regular season

|-
!colspan=12 style=| MVC tournament

Source

References

2021-22
2021–22 Missouri Valley Conference men's basketball season
2021 in sports in Illinois
2022 in sports in Illinois